Melchior Hendrik "Henk" Brouwer (born 14 September 1953) is a retired Dutch sprinter. He competed at the 1980 Summer Olympics in the 200 m and 4 × 400 m events, but failed to reach the finals.

References

1953 births
Living people
Athletes (track and field) at the 1980 Summer Olympics
Dutch male sprinters
Olympic athletes of the Netherlands
People from Winschoten
Sportspeople from Groningen (province)